Daniel M. Donahue (born May 1, 1987) is an American politician serving in the Massachusetts House of Representatives since September 2013. He is a Worcester resident and a member of the Democratic Party. His district includes Grafton Hill, Vernon Hill, College Hill, the Massasoit Road area, Green Island, and Quinsigamond Village within Worcester.

See also
 2019–2020 Massachusetts legislature
 2021–2022 Massachusetts legislature

References

Living people
Democratic Party members of the Massachusetts House of Representatives
Politicians from Worcester, Massachusetts
21st-century American politicians
1987 births